Northern Ireland Young Communist League was a political youth movement in Northern Ireland, it was formed in 1968. It was the youth wing of the Communist Party of Northern Ireland. It was later amalgamated into the Connolly Youth Movement, following the merger of the party with the Irish Workers League to form the Communist Party of Ireland in 1970.

References

Youth wings of communist parties
Youth wings of political parties in Northern Ireland
Communist Party of Ireland